Beiyanerpeton is an extinct genus of salamandroid amphibians known from the Late Jurassic of western Liaoning Province, China. It contains a single species, B. jianpingensis. Alternative analyses suggest that B. jianpingensis is a stem salamander and not a salamandroid.

Discovery
Beiyanerpeton is known from the holotype specimen PKUP V0601, an almost complete and articulated skeleton exposed in ventral view. Several unnumbered specimens, PKUP V0602-0606, are also referred to B. jianpingensis, and consist of articulated cranial and postcranial skeletons. The type fossil was collected at Guancaishan, near Jianping in the Liaoning Province, from the Tiaojishan Formation (also known as the Lanqi Formation), dating to the Oxfordian stage of the Late Jurassic period, about 157 million years ago.

Etymology
Beiyanerpeton was first described and named by Ke-Qin Gao and Neil H. Shubin in 2012, and the type species is Beiyanerpeton jianpingensis. The generic name is derived from Chinese "Beiyan" meaning northern Yan State, and from Greek herpeton, "creeping animal". The specific name honors Jianping, a county town which is close to the type locality of Beiyanerpeton.

References

Fossil taxa described in 2012
Late Jurassic amphibians
Jurassic salamanders
Prehistoric amphibians of Asia